Group B of the 2009 Fed Cup Americas Zone Group II was one of two pools in Group II of the Americas zone of the 2009 Fed Cup. Four teams competed in a round robin competition, with the top team advancing to Group I for 2010.

Dominican Republic vs. Guatemala

Trinidad and Tobago vs. Cuba

Dominican Republic vs. Cuba

Bolivia vs. Trinidad and Tobago

Bolivia vs. Cuba

Guatemala vs. Trinidad and Tobago

Dominican Republic vs. Trinidad and Tobago

Bolivia vs. Guatemala

Dominican Republic vs. Bolivia

Guatemala vs. Cuba

  placed first in this group and thus advanced to Group I for 2010. They placed last overall, and thus was relegated back to Group II for 2011.

See also
Fed Cup structure

References

External links
 Fed Cup website

2009 Fed Cup Americas Zone